Maryan may refer to:
 Maryan (film), a 2013 Tamil film
Maryan (soundtrack), the soundtrack for the 2013 Tamil film
 Maryan, Bulgaria, a village in Elena Municipality, Veliko Tarnovo Province, Bulgaria
 Maryan, Iran (disambiguation)
 M. Maryan, pseudonym of French novelist (1847-1927)
 Maryan S. Maryan, pseudonym of Israeli-American artist Pinchas Burstein